Kafr Ein is a Palestinian village in the Ramallah and al-Bireh Governorate, located northwest of Ramallah in the central West Bank. According to the Palestinian Central Bureau of Statistics (PCBS), Kafr Ein had a population of 1,743 inhabitants in 2007. Most of the village's population comes from the Barghouti, Rifa' and Rafati  clans.

Location
Kafr 'Ein is   located 17.7 km northwest of Ramallah. It is bordered by Qarawat Bani Zeid, Bani Zeid ash Sharqiya and Deir as Sudan  to the east, Bruqin to the north, Bani Zeid  to the west, and An Nabi Salih  to the south.

History
Kafr Ein is transliterated as "spring village". The village contains ten springs and ten reservoirs, one of which was recently damaged.

It is believed that there is an ancient site at the top of a local mountain known as Haraek, which contains a church and a mosque. According to local legend, the site was destroyed during the Crusades and the single villager who survived its destruction came down to found Kafr Ein.

Ottoman era
Potsherds from the early Ottoman era have been found. It is noted in the Ottoman tax records of the 16th century as being located in the Sanjak of Al-Quds.

Kafr Ein was ruled by the Barghouti family throughout the later half of the  Ottoman rule of Palestine, located within the sheikhdom of Bani Zeid. It produced 52 qintars of olive oil annually, exporting it to Jerusalem or Nablus mainly for traditional soap-making.

In 1838, it was noted under the name of Kefr Iyan as a Muslim village  in the District of Beni Zaid, north of Jerusalem.

The French explorer Victor Guérin  passed by the village in 1870, and noted that it "did not seem very considerable," while an Ottoman village list of about the same year showed a population of 260, in 69 houses, though the population count only included men.

In 1882, the PEF's Survey of Western Palestine described "Kefr Ain" as a "small hamlet on a hill-slope, supplied by the Ain Mathrun."

In 1896 the population of Kefr ‘ain was estimated to be about 516 persons.

British Mandate era
In the 1922 census of Palestine conducted by the British Mandate authorities, the village, called Kufr 'Ain, had a population of 376, all Muslims, increasing in the 1931 census where In Kafr had a population of 494, still all Muslims, in a total of 133 houses.

In the 1945 statistics, the population was 550 Muslims,   while the total land area was 7,145 dunams, according to an official land and population survey. Of  this,  4,928  were allocated  for plantations and irrigable land, 724 for cereals, while 19 dunams were classified as built-up areas.

Jordanian era
In the wake of the 1948 Arab–Israeli War, and after the 1949 Armistice Agreements, Kafr Ein came under Jordanian rule.

The Jordanian census of 1961 found 1,095 inhabitants in Kafr 'Ain.

1967-present
Since the Six-Day War in 1967, Kafr Ein has been held under Israeli occupation.

After the 1995 accords, 97.4% of Kafr Ein land was classified as Area A land, 1.4% as Area B, while the remaining 1.2% is classified as Area C.

Economy
Historically, like most Palestinian villages, Kafr Ein's inhabitants worked mostly as farmers and traders. Prior to the Second Intifada, around 10% of the village's residents worked in Israel. Kafr Ein's main cash crop is olives. However, lentils, grains and vegetables are also grown. There are an estimated 200 sheep and goats in the village.

In 1980, electricity was connected to Kafr Ein. There are ten shops and a school in the village, as well another shared with Qarawat Bani Zeid. Many residents receive aid from the Red Cross and the UNRWA.

Government
Kafr Ein is governed by a village council. The council is made up of six residents who represent the four major families. The current mayor, Mohammed Rifa', was appointed by the Palestinian National Authority in 1998.

References

Bibliography

External links
Welcome To Kafr 'Ayn
Survey of Western Palestine, Map 14:   IAA,  Wikimedia commons   
Kafr  'Ein (Fact Sheet), Applied Research Institute–Jerusalem (ARIJ)
Kafr  'Ein  (Village profile), ARIJ
 Kafr  'Ein  (aerial photo), ARIJ
Locality Development Priorities and Needs in Kafr 'Ein Village, ARIJ

Villages in the West Bank
Municipalities of the State of Palestine